Orayiram Kinakkalal is a 2018 Indian Malayalam-language comedy thriller film directed by Pramod Mohan. The screenplay was written by Kiran Varma and Mohan, with dialogues co-written by Hrishikesh Mundani. The film stars Biju Menon, Roshan Mathew, Sharu Varghese, Kalabhavan Shajohn, Nirmal Palazhi, and Sakshi Agarwal. Orayiram Kinakkalal was released on 6 April 2018.

Synopsis

Sreeram, an Ex NRI gets involved in a quick money making plan along with few other characters. Faced with unexpected turns of event, the story unfolds revealing different shades of each characters and how much they are willing to lose to fulfill their dreams. An unusual ride for a common man who is bound by family and law/crime.

Cast

 Biju Menon as Sreeram
 Roshan Mathew as Jaison
 Sharu Varghese as Sherin
 Kalabhavan Shajohn as Shajahan P. K.
Nirmal Palazhi as Venu
 Sakshi Agarwal as Preethi
 Sai Kumar as Lalaji
 Sreeram Ramachandran as Gautham
 Parthavi as Paaru
 Suresh Krishna as Abraham Mathan
 Krishna Kumar as Stephen
 Ann Benjamin  as Leena Mathan (Abraham Mathan's wife)
 Shaun Xavier as Deepu

Production
Orayiram Kinakkalal is the debut feature film directorial of Pramod Mohan, who has previously worked in television shows. The film is a comedy thriller. Principal photography began on 10 December 2017 at Kochi, Kerala. The film was produced by Renji Panicker.

The production team involves Brijeesh Mohamed, Josemon Simon & Umesh Unnikrishnan (Umesh Nair)

The movie is distributed by Renji Panicker Entertainment

Music
The film features songs composed by Ranjith Meleppat, Sachin Warrier, and Aswin Ram; the score was composed by Bijibal. Lyrics for the songs were written by Santhosh Varma and Manu Manjith.

Release
The film was released on 6 April 2018.

References

External links
 
 

2018 films
2010s Malayalam-language films
Indian comedy thriller films